Oxford is a city in Butler County, Ohio, United States. The population was 23,035 at the 2020 census. In 2014, Oxford was rated by Forbes as the "Best College Town" in the United States, based on a high percentage of students per capita and part-time jobs, and a low occurrence of brain-drain. It is a part of the Cincinnati metropolitan area.

History
Miami University was chartered in 1809, and Oxford was laid out by James Heaton on March 29, 1810, by the Ohio General Assembly's order of February 6, 1810.  It was established in Range 1 East, Town 5 North of the Congress Lands in the southeast quarter of Section 22, the southwest corner of Section 23, the northwest corner of Section 26, and the northeast corner of Section 27.  The original village, consisting of 128 lots, was incorporated on February 23, 1830. Oxford was elevated to city status in 1971.  Freedom Summer started with orientations at Western College for Women in June 1964.  This event is commemorated near the Kumler Chapel on the Western campus, now a part of Miami University.

Oxford became a qualified Tree City USA as recognized by the National Arbor Day Foundation in 1996.

Freedom Summer

1964 training 
In the summer of 1964, a two-week orientation took place in Oxford at the Western College for Women (which later became part of Miami University in 1974) for Freedom Summer volunteers. The orientation, which took place from June 14 to June 27, included training in non-violent resistance for volunteers in preparation for their trip to Mississippi. Once in Mississippi, volunteers would be attempting to register as many black voters as possible amid the violent atmosphere of a racially segregated state. The orientation at Western was originally planned to take place at Kentucky's Berea College, but pressure from Berea alumni who didn't want the controversial volunteer campaign on their campus led organizers to find another space further up north so that "the ties to the South were not quite so strong."

Memorial 
In 2000, a stone monument dedicated to Freedom Summer was built next to the Kumler Chapel on Western Campus. According to Miami University's website, "The grassy bank was chosen because no excavating needed to be done and the proximity both to Peabody Hall and Kumler Chapel seemed to combine the right mix of educational and spiritual properties. From this location, the memorial was also visible from the road. The color of the rocks matches most of the architecture on Western Campus, but the pieces of limestone are meant to convey a story."The memorial tells the story of Freedom Summer with a chronological timeline of events engraved into each limestone bench.

In 2014, there was an addition to the memorial after three Miami University students (Nathan Foley, Jesse Thayer, and Brandon Lowery) built three steel treelike sculptures with wind chimes to fit over the existing trees lining the memorial. These sculptures were made with the intention to further memorialize the brave lives and tragic deaths of James Chaney, Andrew Goodman and Michael Schwerner, the three Freedom Summer volunteers who were murdered while in Mississippi.

2014 also marked the 50th anniversary of Freedom Summer and the volunteer's training in Oxford. Miami University honored the occasion with a special conference and reunion, titled "50 Years After Freedom Summer: Understanding the Past, Building the Future."

Geography
Oxford is a part of Oxford Township, originally called the College Township.

Demographics

2020 census
As of the census of 2020, there were 23,035 people and 7,187 households living in the city. The racial makeup of the city was 79.6% White, 5.0% African American, 0.2% Native American, 8.8% Asian, 1.3% from other races, and 5.2% from two or more races. Hispanic or Latino of any race were 4.0% of the population.

2010 census
As of the census of 2010, there were 21,371 people, 5,799 households, and 1,909 families living in the city. The racial makeup of the city was 87.6% White, 4.0% African American, 0.2% Native American, 5.4% Asian, 0.6% from other races, and 2.2% from two or more races. Hispanic or Latino of any race were 2.3% of the population.

There were 5,799 households, of which 14.4% had children under the age of 18 living with them, 24.6% were married couples living together, 6.1% had a female householder with no husband present, 2.2% had a male householder with no wife present, and 67.1% were non-families. 33.7% of all households were made up of individuals, and 6.8% had someone living alone who was 65 years of age or older. The average household size was 2.40 and the average family size was 2.78.

The median age in the city was 21.4 years. 6.8% of residents were under the age of 18; 67.9% were between the ages of 18 and 24; 10.9% were from 25 to 44; 8.8% were from 45 to 64; and 5.6% were 65 years of age or older. The gender makeup of the city was 47.6% male and 52.4% female.

2000 census
As of the census of 2000, there were 21,943 people, 5,870 households, and 2,066 families living in the city.  The population density was 3,734.4 people per square mile (1,440.9/km2).  There were 6,134 housing units at an average density of 1,043.9 per square mile (402.8/km2).  The racial makeup of the city was 91.2% White, 4.3% African American, 0.2% Native American, 2.4% Asian, <0.1% Pacific Islander, 0.5% from other races, and 1.4% from two or more races. Hispanic or Latino of any race were 1.44% of the population.

There were 5,870 households, out of which 16.5% had children under the age of 18 living with them, 26.8% were married couples living together, 6.4% had a female householder with no husband present, and 64.8% were non-families. 32.0% of all households were made up of individuals, and 5.5% had someone living alone who was 65 years of age or older.  The average household size was 2.43 and the average family size was 2.85.

In the city, the population was spread out, with 8.3% under the age of 18, 66.8% from 18 to 24, 11.7% from 25 to 44, 8.4% from 45 to 64, and 4.8% who were 65 years of age or older.  The median age was 21 years. For every 100 females, there were 87.8 males.  For every 100 females age 18 and over, there were 87.1 males.

The median income for a household in the city was $25,164, and the median income for a family was $52,589. Males had a median income of $35,833 versus $24,637 for females. The per capita income for the city was $12,165.  About 13.4% of families and 43.7% of the population were below the poverty line, including 18.8% of those under age 18 and 8.1% of those age 65 or over.

Culture
Oxford is home to an array of festivals and events throughout the year, including the Uptown Music Concerts and the Wine Festival. Additionally, Miami University provides access to a wide range of events, from lectures sponsored by the various departments (the Humanities Department, for example, has a consistently full calendar of events open to the public ), to live performances by the Theater and Music departments. Every year a schedule of events is organized through the Miami Performing Arts Series (MPAS)  who have brought well known entertainers to town such as Trevor Noah  and Wayne Brady.

In January 2018, the website Livability.com ranked Oxford #74 on its list of Top 100 Best Places to Live. According to the website, "Oxford features a fun, college-town atmosphere with multiple shops, restaurants, and entertainment venues." The description of Oxford also includes praise for the "several miles of hiking trails" and "affordable housing options throughout the city."

Uptown Music Concerts 
Formerly known as the Summer Music Concert Series, the Uptown Music Concerts is a four-month long event thrown by the town's visitor center, Enjoy Oxford. Every Thursday night from June through September, concert-goers are treated to a free outdoor performance in the uptown park. Musicians take the stage under the pavilion while the audience sets out chairs and blankets in the grassy knoll below. The lineup of musicians throughout the four months continues to be impressive, bringing in talent from all over the country.

Oxford Wine & Craft Beer Festival 
The Oxford Wine Festival is an annual summer festival that takes place in the historic uptown district of Oxford. The festival, which is thrown by the Oxford Chamber of Commerce, includes a variety of wine vendors, a beer garden, live musical performances, and booths for merchants and artisans selling handmade goods.

Oxford Community Arts Center 

The Oxford Community Arts Center (OCAC) is a performing arts facility where several major events in town take place both annually and regularly. These events include the Chocolate Meltdown (a January event featuring a range of chocolate tastings).

The OCAC building was previously used for the Oxford Female Institute in 1849, then as the Oxford College for Women in 1906 after the Oxford Female Institute merged with the Oxford Female College. After the closing of the school in 1928, Miami University bought the building and renovated it to the Georgian style it is today. Even with its renovations, guests can see many of the building's historical details. The building now provides Oxford with a ballroom, meeting and classroom facilities, and artist studios. It is often used as a venue for large events such as weddings.

Museums 
Oxford has several museums throughout the town. The Robert A. Hefner Museum of Natural History, the Karl E. Limper Geology Museum, the William Holmes McGuffey Museum, and the Miami University Art Museum (MUAM). The MUAM is free and open to the public, and houses a range of galleries and exhibits throughout the year. Additionally, the MUAM boasts an impressive permanent collection of over 17,000 works, "many of which are regularly available to the public through exhibition display in one or more of the Museum's five gallery spaces."

Environment 
The Miami University Natural Areas has over 17 miles of hiking trails throughout Oxford. Hikers can hike through the Silvoor Biology Sanctuary and up to the bluffs, or through the 100 acre Western Woods to enjoy a "magnificent stand of oaks, beech and maples" on the trail that was designated a National Natural Landmark

Additionally, the Hueston Woods State Park is just five miles outside of Oxford proper. The park features 12 miles of trails, as well as a 96-room lodge overlooking Acton Lake.

Education

Primary and secondary
Talawanda School District is the public school district serving Oxford. It was listed as one of the top 100 public school systems in the country by Offspring Magazine, a Forbes publication (Sep/Oct 2000). Sixty-one of the 100 districts listed were college town districts. Offspring worked with SchoolMatch.com using student score criteria, cost of living, academic performance and academic expenditures to develop a more complete overview of school districts. The article said these are districts that give you the most return for your housing/K-12 public school education dollar.

The McGuffey Montessori School is a Montessori school providing an alternative educational environment for students grades PK-8.

Post-secondary

Miami University, the large public research university of around 20,000 students that Oxford was established around, has historically always been the largest and most prominent post-secondary institution in the city. The Western College for Women operated from 1853 to 1974, first as a seminary and later as a liberal arts college before it merged with Miami University. The Oxford College for Women in uptown Oxford was founded in 1849 in affiliation with the Presbyterian Church, and became a dormitory of Miami in 1928 before it became the Oxford Community Arts Center.

Libraries
Oxford has a public library, a branch of the Lane Libraries.

Greek-letter organizations
Oxford is home to the national offices of five Greek-letter organizations including the home office of the international business fraternity of Delta Sigma Pi, social sorority Delta Zeta and social fraternities Beta Theta Pi, Phi Delta Theta, and Phi Kappa Tau.  All but Delta Sigma Pi were founded at Miami University. Sigma Chi was also founded at Miami University, and Sigma Chi's founding site building on the north side of High Street at the town square is currently a mixed-use commercial building owned by the Sigma Chi Foundation. Visitors can also see the room on the 2nd floor where Sigma Chi's seven founders started the Fraternity on June 28, 1855.

Notable people

 Walter Alston, Major League Baseball manager, member of the National Baseball Hall of Fame and Museum
 Bill Bartlett, lead guitarist of The Lemon Pipers, psychedelic/bubblegum pop band, they had a Billboard #1 hit in 1968, "Green Tambourine"
 Jerome Conley, former mayor of Oxford and Dean of Miami University
 Khashyar Darvich, film producer and director
 David J. Eicher, chief editor of Astronomy magazine and author of publications on astronomy and American History
 Edith Emerson, painter
 Weeb Ewbank, football coach, 3-time World Champion (1958, 1959, 1968), member of Pro Football Hall of Fame
 Earle Foxe, theater and film actor
 Victor Furth, architect
 Kason Gabbard, Major League Baseball pitcher
 Nick Gillespie, libertarian journalist, former editor-in-chief of Reason magazine, current editor of reason.tv
 Caroline Harrison, wife of President Benjamin Harrison
 Russell Benjamin Harrison, son of Benjamin and Caroline Harrison, Indiana politician
 Darrell Hedric, basketball head coach and scout
 Oliver Toussaint Jackson, businessman
 Edgar Stillman Kelley, composer and music educator at Western College for Women
 Lorenzo Lorraine Langstroth, "Father of American Beekeeping"
 Henry MacCracken, educator, chancellor of University of Pittsburgh and New York University
 William Holmes McGuffey, educator
 William H. McSurely, Illinois state representative and judge
 Maurice Rocco, pianist

Sister cities
Oxford has one sister city:

 Differdange, Luxembourg

References

Further reading
 Brent S. Barlow, W.H. Todhunter, Stephen D. Cone, Joseph J. Pater, and Frederick Schneider, eds.  Centennial History of Butler County, Ohio.  Hamilton, Ohio:  B.F. Bowen, 1905.
 Jim Blount.  The 1900s:  100 Years In the History of Butler County, Ohio.  Hamilton, Ohio:  Past Present Press, 2000.
 Butler County Engineer's Office.  Butler County Official Transportation Map, 2003.  Fairfield Township, Butler County, Ohio:  The Office, 2003.
 Miami University Factbook.
 A History and Biographical Cyclopaedia of Butler County, Ohio with Illustrations and Sketches of Its Representative Men and Pioneers.  Cincinnati, Ohio:  Western Biographical Publishing Company, 1882. 
 Ohio. Secretary of State.  The Ohio municipal and township roster, 2002-2003.  Columbus, Ohio:  The Secretary, 2003.
 "The 100 Best School Districts in the U.S.", Offspring, September/October 2000.

External links

 City of Oxford
 Oxford Visitors Bureau

Populated places established in 1810
Cities in Butler County, Ohio
Miami University
1810 establishments in Ohio
Cities in Ohio